GMC Sierra (Classic) may refer to GMC counterparts, either as model names or as trim lines, to the following Chevrolet vehicles:

Chevrolet C/K 
Chevrolet Silverado 
Chevrolet Suburban

Sierra
Pickup trucks